Ligah (also Romanized as Līgāh; also known as Legā) is a village in Jennat Rudbar Rural District, in the Central District of Ramsar County, Mazandaran Province, Iran. At the 2006 census, its population was 18, in 17 families.

References 

Populated places in Ramsar County